This is a list of Registered Historic Places in Cumberland, Rhode Island.

|}

See also

National Register of Historic Places listings in Providence County, Rhode Island
List of National Historic Landmarks in Rhode Island

References

N
.N
.
Cumberland
Cumberland, Rhode